Thomas Hamlet Averett (July 10, 1800 – June 30, 1855) was a slave owner and U.S. Representative from Virginia.

Biography
Born near Halifax, Virginia, Averett attended the common schools.
He served as a drummer boy in the War of 1812.

He studied medicine.  He was graduated from Jefferson Medical College, Philadelphia, Pennsylvania, and practiced in Halifax and the adjacent counties.

He served in the State senate in 1848 and 1849.
He was an unsuccessful candidate for election in 1846 to the Thirtieth Congress.

Averett was elected as a Democrat to the Thirty-first and Thirty-second Congresses (March 4, 1849 – March 3, 1853).  During that time, he was responsible for future Confederate cavalry general J.E.B. Stuart's appointment to attend West Point.

He was an unsuccessful candidate for renomination in 1852.
He resumed the practice of medicine in Halifax County.
He died near Halifax Court House, Virginia, June 30, 1855.
He was interred in the family burial ground near Halifax Court House.

Elections

1849; Averett was elected to the U.S. House of Representatives with 50.75% of the vote, defeating Whig Thomas Stanhope Flournoy.
1851; Averett was re-elected with 57.38% of the vote, defeating Whig Flournoy.

References

Sources

1800 births
1855 deaths
Thomas Jefferson University alumni
United States Army personnel of the War of 1812
Democratic Party members of the United States House of Representatives from Virginia
19th-century American politicians
People from Halifax County, Virginia